Amber is a feminine given name taken from amber, the fossilized tree resin that is often used in the making of jewelry. The word can also refer to a yellowish-orange color.

Amber has been a popular name in most English speaking countries. It was the 20th most popular name in the United States in the 1990s. It has ranked among the top 50 names for girls in England and Wales, Scotland, Ireland, Belgium, Australia and Canada in recent years. Variants have also been popular in other countries, including Ámbar in Spanish, which is currently among the most popular names for girls in Argentina, Ambre in French, which was among the top 10 names for newborn girls in France in recent years, and the Italian  Ambra, which was among the top 10 names for baby girls in Albania in recent years.

People 
 Amber (performer) (born 1969), a pop music/dance music performer and singer
 Amber, a stage name for the J-pop music artist Rie Eto
 Amber Aguirre (born 1958), American ceramic sculptor
 Amber Benson (born 1977), American actress
 Amber Bondin (born 1991), Maltese singer
 Amber Campisi, American model, Playmate of the month for February 2005
 Amber Corwin (born 1978), American figure skater
 Amber Chia (born 1981), Malaysian model and actress
 Amber Frey, the mistress of convicted murderer Scott Peterson
 Amber Gill (born 1997), English television personality and author
 Amber Glenn (born 1999), American figure skater
 Amber Hagerman (1986–1996), American murder victim, after whom the AMBER Alert was named
 Amber Heard (born 1986), American actress
 Amber Hikes, American civil rights activist
 Amber Hood (born 1970), American actress
 Amber Joseph (born 1999), Barbadian cyclist
 Amber Littlejohn (born 1975), Native American professional figure competitor
 Amber Liu (singer) (born 1992), Taiwanese-American singer who is a member of f(x)
 Amber Liu (tennis), (born 1984), American tennis player
 Amber Lynn (born 1964), American pornographic actress
 Amber MacArthur (born 1976), Canadian internet and television personality
 Amber Mariano (born 1978), American television personality
 Amber Merritt (born 1993), Australian wheelchair basketball player
 Amber Portwood (born 1990), American reality television personality and criminal
 Amber Rayne (1984–2016), American pornographic actress
 Amber Riley (born 1986), American actress, most famous for her role on the television series Glee as Mercedes
 Amber Rose (born 1983), American model
 Amber Rudd (born 1963), British politician, MP for Hastings and Rye, former Home Secretary
 Amber Ruffin (born 1979), American writer, comedian, talk-show host
 Amber Scorah, Canadian-American writer, speaker, and activist
 Amber Scott, Australian ballet dancer
 Amber Shepherd, stage name Amba Shepherd, Australian singer
 Amber Tamblyn (born 1983), American actress
 Amber Valletta (born 1974), American actress and model
 Amber Wadham (born 1996), Australian internet personality, also known as Paladin Amber
 Amber Ward (born 2001), Australian rules footballer

Fictional characters
 Amber Atkins, a character in the 1999 American black comedy mockumentary movie Drop Dead Gorgeous
 Amber Gates, from the British television series Footballers' Wives
 Amber Keenan, titular character in the Irish film Dating Amber
 Amber Lamont, main character in the book Demon Road
 Amber Millington, from American television series House of Anubis
 Amber Moore, a character on the American soap opera The Bold and the Beautiful and The Young and the Restless 
 Amber Moss, a character from the sitcom Unhappily Ever After
 Amber Pigal-Simpson, the illegal wife of Homer Simpson
 Amber Rhoades, from the American TV sitcom Married... with Children
 Amber Snoeckx, a recurring character from the Belgian series wtFOCK
 Amber St. Clare, in the novel Forever Amber
 Amber Volakis, from the American television series House
 Amber Von Tussle, from the 1988 film Hairspray
 Amber Whitmire, an antagonistic character in 1995 film Casper
 Amber Williams, main character in the horror film I'll Always Know What You Did Last Summer
 Amber, a major recurring character in American television series Andi Mack
 Amber, a playable character from the mobile game Brawl Stars
 Amber, from American television series Clueless
 Amber, from the anime series Darker than Black
 Amber, in the American television series Hannah Montana
 Amber is one of three identities of the Fool, who appears only in The Liveship Traders Trilogy by Robin Hobb
 Amber, a deceased minor character in the Pokémon franchise
 Amber the Orange Fairy, from the Rainbow Magic book franchise
 Amber, from the video game Rune Factory 4
 Amber, in the video game Genshin Impact
 Amber, from the 1999 British / New Zealand television series The Tribe
 Amber (The One-Legged Hypoglycemic), a recurring Saturday Night Live character played by Amy Poehler
 Amber, a dog from the animated film Scooby-Doo and the Alien Invaders
 Amber, a recurring character in the third volume of the animated web series RWBY
 Princess Amber, from the American animated television series Sofia the First

Literature
 Amber Brown (series), a character in a book by Paula Danziger
 Amber House, a 2012 novel in a trilogy by Kelly Moore and daughters Tucker Reed and Larkin Reed
 The Chronicles of Amber, a fantasy novel series written by Roger Zelazny
 Forever Amber, a novel by Kathleen Winsor in 1944, and a film in 1947

Notes

English feminine given names
Given names derived from gemstones
Lists of people by given name